Freebird is a 2008 British comedy film directed by Jon Ivay and starring Gary Stretch, Geoff Bell, Phil Daniels and Peter Bowles.

Plot
Three friends, Fred (Stretch), Tyg (Bell) and Grouch (Daniels), set out on a motorcycle trip to Wales in  order to bring back a haul of cannabis for Fred's friend The Chairman (Bowles). What was meant to be a nice weekend in the country soon turns into an ordeal.

Along the way, they encounter revenge seeking bikers and a giant masked wrestler in the pub. Or maybe it's just those magic mushrooms they had for breakfast.

Production
The film was shot in and around Hay-on-Wye in Wales, and London.

References

External links
 
 

2008 films
2008 comedy films
Motorcycling films
Outlaw biker films
2000s English-language films
2000s British films
British comedy television films